The 17th Frigate Squadron was an administrative unit of the Royal Navy from 1955 to 1972.

Operational history

During its existence, the squadron included Type 15 and  frigates. The squadron served as the Dartmouth Training Squadron for cadets at Britannia Royal Naval College.

The main task of the squadron was to train officer cadets in basic ship experience. Sea time experience was given also to young Royal Marine officers and Engine Room Artificer apprentices. There were three cruises a year which coincided with the terms at Dartmouth College. These cruises usually alternated between the Mediterranean and the Baltic. The squadron was disbanded in 1972.

Squadron commander

References

See also
 List of squadrons and flotillas of the Royal Navy

Frigate squadrons of the Royal Navy